The 1926 Alberta general election was held on June 28, 1926, to elect members of the  Legislative Assembly of Alberta. The United Farmers of Alberta government that had first been elected in 1921 was re-elected, taking a majority of the seats in the Alberta Legislature. Herbert Greenfield had resigned as United Farmers leader and premier, and John E. Brownlee led the UFA to this second election victory, increasing the UFA's number of seats.

The writs of election were issued on May 10, 1926, allowing an election period of 40 days.

1926 was Alberta's first general election where Single transferable voting (STV) was used in the three largest cities and Instant-runoff voting was used everywhere else.

Calgary, Edmonton and Medicine Hat continued to be multi member districts. Edmonton elected five members; Calgary elected five members; and Medicine Hat elected two. Previously they had elected members by Plurality block voting. Now they elected members using STV-PR, through the Hare Proportional representation system. 

Outside the large cities, districts were single member districts and MLAs were elected under Alternative Voting system. Rural voters, like their city counterparts, cast preferential ballots and had ability to rank the candidates. The seat was filled by the candidate who received a majority of the votes whether through first-choice votes or a combination of first-choice votes and votes transferred from less-popular candidates.

This dual system of voting would last until 1956. Medicine Hat after 1926 changed to a single-member constituency, whose MLA was elected through Alternative Voting.

Under STV in Edmonton, the UFA captured one seat in Edmonton where it had taken no seats in 1921 under the Liberal government's Block Voting system. The Labour party also for the first time elected an MLA in Edmonton. As well, Edmonton voters elected a Liberal and two Conservatives. This mixed crop of representatives was much better balanced than the single-party sweeps that Edmonton had previously elected through other electoral systems.

The UFA also took a great share of the rural seats, taking 42 of the province's 49 rural seats. It took four rural seats that had been captured by Liberal candidates in 1921 (Beaver River, Leduc, Sedgewick and Whitford), and one that had been won by an Independent in 1921 (Claresholm). The UFA also won the district of Empress formerly known as Redcliffe, which had been won by the UFA in 1921. No UFA candidate ran for re-election to its seat in Medicine Hat. It gained a seat in the newly created next-door Cypress district. It also lost its St. Albert seat. 

The UFA derived no benefit from Alternative Voting - it would have won all but one of the seats it won under Alternative Voting if the contest had been conducted using Plurality voting. And it lost one seat that it would have won if the contest had been held using Plurality voting (in Bow Valley).

Conservatives, being a less popular party, had been badly treated under FPTP and Block Voting in 1921 but now did better. It won two seats each in Edmonton and Calgary, where Block Voting had been replaced by STV.

At the time of the election call, six seats were sitting vacant. They had been vacated by MLAs who had run in the 1925 federal election. MLA C.W. Cross was elected in the federal election. William McCartney Davidson, Calgary Independent MLA, was another one of those who had left. 

The UFA vote share went up 10 percent in this election compared to 1921. This shows effect of the change in voting system - the UFA actually received 15,000 fewer votes in 1926 than in 1921. The Liberals received 54,000 fewer. The change in percentage of UFA support is likely more a result of urban voters not being allowed to cast multiple voters as they had done in 1921. That had artificially raised the Liberal vote count and percentage and had lowered the UFA percentage recorded for the 1921 election. 

In 1926 the UFA vote count outside the cities was 69,000, having gone down from the 81,000 the party's candidates had received outside the cities in 1921. The UFA's vote total was about 50 percent of the first-preference votes cast outside the cities. Through transfers it received a majority of votes in each of the 42 districts where its candidate won.

Under STV Edmonton elected a mixed bag of representatives. UFA, Liberal, Conservative and Labour MLAs were all elected, which compared well with the total sweep that Liberals made in 1921 under Block Voting. 

In Calgary Conservative supporters found representation under STV where they had been shut out under Block Voting in 1921. 

Under STV in Medicine Hat, a Liberal and a Conservative took the city's two seats - which was fair as the two parties had about equal support there.

Under Alternative Voting outside the cities, if no candidate took a majority of votes in the first count, votes were transferred until a candidate acceptable to a majority of the voters was determined. In Bow Valley the UFA candidate leading in the first count did not have as much support from Conservative supporters and a Liberal took the seat. 

In four districts only two candidates ran so vote transfers were not needed.  Three-way contests would be a feature of most elections from here on in, as Canada had passed the point when only two parties dominated politics. Labour and farmer parties were here to stay to fight it out against the two old-line parties. 

In fifteen of the province's 49 rural districts, three or more candidates ran and vote-splitting meant no one candidate took a majority of the votes on the first count. A UFA candidate was in the top spot in most of these contests. Liberal and Conservative party supporters were split on whether to support the other old-line party or the UFA, if their candidate was eliminated and their ballots able to be transferred to another. In many cases many Conservative and Liberal back-up preferences were marked for the UFA candidate, and in eight of those 15 districts the UFA candidate who had been leading in the first count won the seat, in three the Liberal leading was elected in the end, and in two the Labour candidate was leading and elected in the end.

The only turn-overs where the candidate leading in the first count was not elected were in Bow Valley and Pincher Creek. In Pincher Creek, back-up preferences on votes at first placed on the Conservative candidate favoured the UFA candidate, who took the seat over the previously-leading Liberal candidate. In Bow Valley, vote transfers from the Conservative candidate went mostly to the Liberal, who passed the UFA candidate in popularity. Overall party-wise the two turn-overs cancelled each other but two different individuals were elected due to the Alternative Voting system than would have been elected under FPTP. 

The UFA's seat majority was due to its victories in the rural areas. Its moral right to power rested on the fact that to be elected in a rural district a candidate had to have support from a majority of a district's voters. The UFA was elected through majority support in 42 of the province's 52 districts, and its candidate in Edmonton was the most popular of all the candidates who ran there as well.

Results

Actually five Conservatives were elected -- two in Edmonton, two in Calgary and one in Medicine Hat. This change from four brings the total number of seats to 61, not 60.

Members elected
For complete electoral history, see individual districts

(* Cook's defeat of Liberal candidate Bossenberry is the only instance in this election where a candidate who led in the first count was not elected in a second round count, under the preferential balloting system.)

See also
List of Alberta political parties

References

Further reading
 

1926 elections in Canada
1926
June 1926 events
1926 in Alberta